Ore Hill is an unincorporated community and census-designated place (CDP) in Blair County, Pennsylvania, United States. It was first listed as a CDP prior to the 2020 census.

The CDP is on the southern edge of Blair County, in the southern part of Taylor Township along the Bedford County line.

Demographics

References 

Census-designated places in Blair County, Pennsylvania
Census-designated places in Pennsylvania